The Last Target is a 1972 British thriller film starring Michael Redgrave. It is one of his last films.

References

External links

1972 films
1972 drama films
British drama films
1970s English-language films
1970s British films